Northern Cavaliers is the domestic field hockey team for the Gilgit-Baltistan in Pakistan. It is part of the Pakistan Hockey Federation.

Pakistani field hockey clubs